Alec Longstreth (born October 4, 1979) is a comics creator and illustrator living in Santa Fe, New Mexico whose works include Phase 7 and the Dvorak Zine.

He is a graduate of Oberlin College and Pratt Institute.

Awards
2005 Ignatz Award for Outstanding Minicomic (Phase 7)
2007 Ignatz Award for Outstanding Debut Comic (Papercutter #6)

References

External links
 alec-longstreth.com
 Alec Longstreth's Illustration Portfolio
Alec Longstreth shares his excitement for drawing comics - and some tips for aspiring artists April 2009 New York Daily News interview.
 What Your Professor Did This Summer Comic August 2011 Seven Days interview.

1979 births
Alternative cartoonists
American cartoonists
Ignatz Award winners
Living people
Oberlin College alumni
Pratt Institute alumni
Center for Cartoon Studies alumni